This list of New York University alumni includes notable graduates and non-graduate former students of New York University.

Legend
The following abbreviations and notes are used to represent NYU schools and colleges:

In 1973, the New York University School of Engineering and Science merged into Polytechnic Institute of Brooklyn, which in turn merged into NYU to form New York University Polytechnic School of Engineering in 2014. In 2015, the school changed its name to NYU Tandon School of Engineering.

Academia and research

Educators

 Haim Ben-Shahar, Israeli economist and President of Tel Aviv University
 J. David Bleich (born 1936), rabbi and authority on Jewish law and ethics
 Edgar Fiedler (1929–2003), economist
 Michael Hudson (born 1939), economics professor
Francis Kilcoyne (died 1985), President of Brooklyn College
Howard Lesnick (1931-2020), Jefferson B. Fordham Professor of Law, University of Pennsylvania Law School
 Josef Singer (1923-2009), Israeli aeronautical engineer and President of Technion – Israel Institute of Technology

Professors, researchers and scientists

Abel Prize recipients

MacArthur Fellows

National Medals for Science, Technology and Innovation, Arts and Humanities recipients

Nobel laureates

Business

Entertainment

Academy Award winners

Emmy Award winners

Grammy Award winners

Tony Award winners

Medicine

Music

Politics, law and government

Members of the United States House of Representatives

Members of the United States Senate

United States Governors

Ambassadors from the United States

Judges

Attorneys

United States Cabinet members, foreign government, royalty, and other

Religion

Press, literature, and arts

Pulitizer Prize winners

 Joel Shatzky (1943-2020), writer and literary professor

Sports 
As of 2013, NYU has been associated with at least 74 men and 10 women who have participated as athletes, coaches, or managers at Olympic Games, for a total of at least 28 Olympic medals.

Other

Fictional 
The following are characters in film, television, literature, and other media that have a connection to the university:

 Ruth Madoff (born 1941), wife of Bernie Madoff.

See also 

:Category:New York University alumni
List of NYU College of Arts and Science people
List of NYU Stern people
List of NYU Tandon School of Engineering people
List of NYU Courant Institute people
List of NYU GSAS people
List of NYU Law School people
List of NYU School of Medicine people
List of NYU Tisch School of the Arts people
List of NYU Gallatin people
List of NYU Steinhardt people
List of New York University honorary degree recipients
List of New York University faculty

References

External links

Lists of people by university or college in New York (state)

Alumni